Yahmureh-ye Yek (also Romanized as Yaḩmūreh-ye Yek; also known as Yaḩmūreh and Yoḩmūreh) is a village in Shoaybiyeh-ye Gharbi Rural District, Shadravan District, Shushtar County, Khuzestan Province, Iran. At the 2006 census, its population was 369, in 67 families.

References 

Populated places in Shushtar County